Lagocephalus gloveri is a species of fish in the family Tetraodontidae. It is found in Hong Kong, Indonesia, Japan, and Taiwan.

References

Sources

Lagocephalus
Fish described in 1983
Taxa named by Tokiharu Abe
Taxonomy articles created by Polbot